The Canton of Argueil is a former canton situated in the Seine-Maritime département and in the Haute-Normandie region of northern France. It was disbanded following the French canton reorganisation which came into effect in March 2015. It consisted of 14 communes, which joined the canton of Gournay-en-Bray in 2015. It had a total of 5,568 inhabitants (2012).

Geography 
An area of farming and forestry in the arrondissement of Dieppe, centred on the town of Argueil. The altitude varies from 53m (Croisy-sur-Andelle) to 231m (Beauvoir-en-Lyons) with an average altitude of 160m.

The canton comprised 14 communes:

Argueil
Beauvoir-en-Lyons
La Chapelle-Saint-Ouen
Croisy-sur-Andelle
La Feuillie
Fry
La Hallotière
La Haye
Hodeng-Hodenger
Mésangueville
Le Mesnil-Lieubray
Morville-sur-Andelle
Nolléval
Sigy-en-Bray

Population

See also 
 Arrondissements of the Seine-Maritime department
 Cantons of the Seine-Maritime department
 Communes of the Seine-Maritime department

References

Argueil
2015 disestablishments in France
States and territories disestablished in 2015